Alessio De Petrillo (born 21 November 1967) is an Italian football coach and a former player. He is an assistant coach of the Poland national team.

Career

Footballer

Won of Lino De Petrillo, Pisa player and captain for long, he started playing in the nerazzurri youth team.

He played in 1986-87 for Empoli, never debuting in Serie A; he later spent his career in Serie C with several teams.

Coach
As a coach, he got his first experience in Serie D with Cascina. He even managed Sansovino and Gubbio in Serie C2 and Monza in Lega Pro Prima Divisione (2010-11).

He has been the coach of Alessandria in Lega Pro Seconda Divisione until September 28, 2011. In October 2018, he became the manager of Prato for the second time. He left Prato at the end of the 2018–19 season as the team finished in 9th place and failed to return to Serie C. In January 2021, he joined Legia Warsaw as an assistant coach under Czesław Michniewicz. De Petrillo later joined his staff at the Poland national team on 31 May 2022.

References

External links
 Alessio De Petrillo coach profile at TuttoCalciatori.net 
 

1967 births
Living people
Sportspeople from Pisa
Italian footballers
Association football midfielders
Pisa S.C. players
Empoli F.C. players
Calcio Foggia 1920 players
Olbia Calcio 1905 players
A.C. Cuneo 1905 players
Pisa S.C. managers
A.C. Tuttocuoio 1957 San Miniato players
Italian football managers
A.S. Gubbio 1910 managers
A.C. Monza managers
U.S. Alessandria Calcio 1912 managers
Serie C managers
Serie D managers
Italian expatriate football managers
Expatriate football managers in Poland
Italian expatriate sportspeople in Poland
Footballers from Tuscany